Joseph Funk House is a historic home located at Singers Glen, Rockingham County, Virginia. It was built about 1810, and is a -story, log dwelling with a gable roof and an undercut front gallery. The house is sheathed with weatherboarding.  Its builder Joseph Funk (1777-1862), was a leader in the Mennonite faith and an influential musical theorist who was the grandson of a German Palatine settler of Bernese Swiss descent. The second-floor room where the printing press, formerly located in a separate building, was placed was originally a loom room.  It was converted to a school room in 1837. The building served as Funk's publishing house from 1847 until 1878.

It was listed on the National Register of Historic Places in 1975.

References

Houses on the National Register of Historic Places in Virginia
Houses completed in 1810
Houses in Rockingham County, Virginia
Mennonitism in Virginia
National Register of Historic Places in Rockingham County, Virginia
Palatine German settlement in Virginia
Pennsylvania Dutch culture in Virginia
Swiss-American culture in Virginia